The Canton of Vimy was a canton in northern France, in the Pas-de-Calais département. It was disbanded following the French canton reorganisation which came into effect in March 2015. It consisted of 20 communes, and had 22,749 inhabitants in 2012.

References

Former cantons of Pas-de-Calais
2015 disestablishments in France
States and territories disestablished in 2015